The genus Geosciurus of African ground squirrels are found in most of the drier parts of southern Africa from South Africa, through to Botswana, and into Namibia.

Species

References

 Geosciurus, Mammals Species of the World

Geosciurus
Fauna of South Africa
Taxa named by Andrew Smith (zoologist)
Rodent genera